Krakout is a Breakout clone that was released for the ZX Spectrum, Amstrad CPC, BBC Micro, Commodore 64, Thomson computers and MSX platforms in 1987. One of the wave of enhanced Breakout variants to emerge in the wake of Arkanoid, its key distinctions are that gameplay is horizontal in layout, and that it allows the player to select the acceleration characteristics of the bat before playing. It was written by Andy Green and Rob Toone and published by Gremlin Graphics. The music was composed by Ben Daglish.

Reception
In 1990, Dragon gave the game 4 out of 5 stars, calling it "one of our favorites, this is Breakout with a different flavor".

Reviews
Computer Gamer (Jun, 1987)
Tilt (May, 1987)
Happy Computer (1987)
ASM (Aktueller Software Markt) (Mar, 1987)
Tilt (Jul, 1987)
Computer Gamer (Apr, 1987)
Commodore User (Apr, 1987)
Your Sinclair (Feb, 1989)
Zzap! (Apr, 1987)
Crash! (Feb, 1989)

References

External links

Krakout at Complete BBC Games Archive

1987 video games
Breakout clones
BBC Micro and Acorn Electron games
Amstrad CPC games
Commodore 64 games
MSX games
ZX Spectrum games
Video games scored by Ben Daglish
Video games developed in the United Kingdom